Doris Bisang (born 28 January 1951) is a Swiss athlete. She competed in the women's high jump at the 1972 Summer Olympics.

References

1951 births
Living people
Athletes (track and field) at the 1972 Summer Olympics
Swiss female high jumpers
Olympic athletes of Switzerland
Place of birth missing (living people)